The 2018 Women's European championships of international draughts were held from 16 to 22 December in Moscow in main program and in superblitz.

The winner was Matrena Nogovitsyna, silver was Natalia Shestakova and third was Elena Milshina (all from Russia).

Classic tournament

Rules and regulations
Participants played Swiss-system tournament with 9 rounds. To define the places with equal points used of Solkoff truncated coefficient. Time control was 1 hour 20 minutes plus a minute per move.

Participants
47 participants from 8 countries, including, 8 international grandmasters, 11 international masters and 8 masters of the FMJD.

GMIF — women's international grandmastersMIF — women's international mastersMFF — women's masters of the FMJD

Final standings

Superblitz tournament

Rules and regulations
Swiss-system tournament with 9 rounds.

To define the places with equal points used of Solkoff truncated coefficient.

Time control was 5 minutes plus 2 seconds per move.

39 participants from 4 countries, including, 4 international grandmasters, 7 international masters and 7 masters of the FMJD.

Final standings

References

External links
 Site European Championship 2018
 The results of the championship
 Superblitz result

2018 in draughts
2018 Women's
2018 in Russian women's sport
International sports competitions hosted by Russia
Sports competitions in Moscow
December 2018 sports events in Russia